Ministry of Legal Affairs (Arabic: وزارة الشؤون القانونية) is a cabinet ministry of Yemen.

List of ministers 

 Ahmed Omar Arman (18 December 2020–present)
 Mohamed al-Mekhlafi (2011–2014)
 Rashad al-Rasas ( 2007– 2011)
 Adnan al-Jafri (2006)

See also 

 Politics of Yemen

References 

Government ministries of Yemen